Diafrix are an Australian hip hop duo, Azmarino (Khaled Abdulwahab) and Momo (Mohammed Komba), which formed in 2001. Their music mixes funk, soul, reggae and dancehall.

At the EG Awards of 2009, the won Best New Talent.

Biography

Azmarino (Khaled Abdulwahab) met Momo (Mohammed Komba) in the Melbourne suburb of Footscray in 2001 at a hip-hop clinic for school students held at a community art centre, hosted by Joelistics from TZU. Azmarino was born in Eritrea and Momo was born in the Comoros Islands. Joelistics suggested the pair work together, so they formed Diafrix.

Diafrix has opened for such acts as Bliss n Eso, as well as international acts such as Macklemore and Ryan Lewis. Their song "Running It" was adopted as the official theme tune for the Western Bulldogs for 2013. Their music has been referred to as "anthemic" for the multicultural area they grew up in. 

Specific influences on their music are diverse, ranging from Nas to Bob Marley to Fat Freddy’s Drop.

Discography

Albums

Extended plays
 The First Sample (2005)
 Second Sample (2015)

Singles

 "Let's Go" (2009)
 "Simple Man" featuring Daniel Merriweather (2011) – Illusive Sounds/Universal Music Australia (ILL048CD) AUS Hitseekers: No. 7
 "Running It" (2012)
 "Easy Come, Easy Go" (2012)
 "I'm a Dreamer" featuring 360 (2012) – Illusive Sounds/Universal Music Australia (AU-LI0-12-84120) AUS Urban: No. 31
 "Radio" (2013) – Illusive Sounds/Universal Music Australia (AU-LI0-12-84150) AUS Urban: No. 13, AUS Hitseekers: No. 13
 "Rest Assured" (2013)
 "The Sign" (2014)

Awards

EG Awards / Music Victoria Awards
The EG Awards (known as Music Victoria Awards since 2013) are an annual awards night celebrating Victorian music. They commenced in 2006.

|-
| EG Awards of 2009
| Diafrix
| Best New Talent
| 
|-

References

Australian hip hop groups